Abdullah Durak (born 1 April 1987 in Niğde, Turkey) is a Turkish professional footballer who currently plays as a central midfielder for TFF First League club Gençlerbirliği.

References

External links

1987 births
People from Niğde
Living people
Turkish footballers
Turkey under-21 international footballers
Turkey B international footballers
Kayserispor footballers
Kastamonuspor footballers
Kasımpaşa S.K. footballers
Gençlerbirliği S.K. footballers
Süper Lig players
Association football midfielders